= Emoddi =

Ancient town located in Anatolia

Coordinates: 38°40′24″N 28°34′45″E

Emoddi, also possibly called Pereudos, was a town of ancient Lydia, inhabited during Hellenistic and Roman times.

Its site is located near Topuzdamları in Asiatic Turkey.
